Acacia yorkrakinensis is a shrub belonging to the genus Acacia and the subgenus Juliflorae that is native to Western Australia.

Description
The grey-green phyllodes have a linear to linear-elliptic to narrowly oblong-elliptic shape and are straight to shallowly curved. It blooms from July to September and produces yellow flowers. The inflorescences form on one to four headed racemes.

Taxonomy
The species was first formally described by the botanist Charles Austin Gardner in 1942 as part of the work Contributiones Florae Australiae Occidentalis as published in the Journal of the Royal Society of Western Australia. It was reclassified as Racosperma yorkrakinense by Leslie Pedley in 2003 and thentransferred back to the Acacia genus in 2006.

The specific epithet is in reference to Yorkrakine, the town where the type specimen was collected. 
 
There are two subspecies;
 Acacia yorkrakinensis subsp. acrita described by R.S.Cowan  and Bruce Maslin in 1995.
  Acacia yorkrakinensis C.A.Gardner subsp. yorkrakinensis.

Distribution
It is endemic to an area in the Whearbelt and Goldfields regions of Western Australia where it is found on sandplains, rocky rises and flats growing in sandy, loamy, clay or gravelly soils. The species is found between Wubin in the north and extends in a south easterly direction down to around Peak Charles National Park where it is a part of mallee heath and open shrubland communities.

See also
List of Acacia species

References

yorkrakinensis
Acacias of Western Australia
Plants described in 1942
Taxa named by Charles Gardner